DJK Germania Gladbeck was a German association football club based in Gladbeck, North Rhine-Westphalia.

History
The club was established in 1923 and following a second-place finish in the Verbandsliga Westfalen (V) in 2007 was promoted to the Oberliga Westfalen, the fourth tier.

In the 2008–2009 season they were coached by Mircea Onisemiuc.

The club experienced financial difficulties, became insolvent and was dissolved in early 2010. It was succeeded by a new club, DJK Alemmannia Gladbeck.

Stadium
The club played its home matches in the Stadion Gladbeck in the Sportplatz Krusenkamp. The facility has a capacity of 37,612.

References

External links
 Club Homepage 

Defunct football clubs in Germany
Defunct football clubs in North Rhine-Westphalia
Association football clubs established in 1923
1923 establishments in Germany
Association football clubs disestablished in 2010
2010 disestablishments in Germany
Football clubs in Germany